Church of All Saints at Kulishki is one of the oldest churches in Moscow, located at 2 Slavyanskaya Square. A notable feature of the church is its leaning bell-tower.

The first wooden church at this place was built by Dmitry Donskoy most likely in 1380 after the Battle of Kulikovo. In the 14th century, the place chosen for the church was far away from the border of Moscow and the word kulichki became a synonym for at the world's end or in the middle of nowhere, but now it is at the historical center of Moscow.

The church was completely rebuilt in stone in 1488 and again in the Muscovite Baroque style in 1687-89.

After the October Revolution, the church was looted. In 1930, it was closed and used in the 1930s by NKVD as the place of mass executions. In 1975, the building was transferred to the Museum of History of Moscow and in 1991, it was returned the Russian Orthodox Church. In 1994, here was placed the cross in the memory of victims of Soviet repressions.

In 1998, the metochion of the Eastern Orthodox Church of Alexandria was moved from Odessa to Moscow and was placed in the Church of All Saints.

External links

 Official information
 Official web-site of Church of All Saints, in Russian 

Churches in Moscow
Churches completed in 1689
Towers completed in 1689
Greek diaspora in Russia
Greek Orthodox Church of Alexandria
Eastern Orthodox church buildings in Russia
Inclined towers
1689 establishments in Russia
Cultural heritage monuments of federal significance in Moscow